Amo is a surname. Notable people with the surname include:

Anton Wilhelm Amo (1703–1759), African-German philosopher and writer
Frangky Amo (born 1986), Indonesian footballer
José María Amo (born 1998), Spanish footballer
Pablo Amo (born 1978), Spanish footballer